Michael Michalowicz (born September 19, 1970) is an American non-fiction author, children’s author, entrepreneur, and lecturer. He is the author of seven business books published by Penguin Random House, including Get Different (2021), Profit First (2017) and Clockwork (2018), and is the former host of the "Business Rescue" segment for MSNBC's Your Business. He was previously the small business columnist for The Wall Street Journal and hosted the reality television program called Bailout!.

Books

Career
Michalowicz founded Olmec Systems  in 1996 and sold the business in a private equity transaction in 2003. In 2003 he co-founded a computer forensic firm, which was a lead examiner in the Enron scandal. That company was acquired by Robert Half International in 2006. Terms were undisclosed. Mike Michalowicz currently owns three companies and has four additional organizations with exclusively licensing rights to his work.

Early life and education
A resident of Mountain Lakes, New Jersey, Michalowicz was raised in Boonton Township, New Jersey and attended Boonton High School. Michalowicz graduated from Virginia Tech in 1993 and was captain of the Virginia Tech men’s lacrosse team. He graduated with two degrees, one in finance and the other in management science.

References

External links
 Official website

1971 births
Living people
Boonton High School alumni
People from Boonton Township, New Jersey
People from Mountain Lakes, New Jersey
21st-century American businesspeople
Virginia Tech alumni
Writers from New Jersey